Philautus surrufus is a species of frogs in the family Rhacophoridae.

It is endemic to the Philippines.
Its natural habitats are subtropical or tropical moist lowland forests and subtropical or tropical moist montane forests.
It is threatened by habitat loss.

References

surrufus
Amphibians of the Philippines
Amphibians described in 1994
Taxonomy articles created by Polbot